Ungdom og Galskap (Youth and Folly) is an 1806 Swedish-language comic opera by Swiss-born composer Édouard Du Puy to his own Swedish libretto based on Jean-Nicolas Bouilly's French libretto for Étienne Méhul's 1802 opera Une folie. The opera was created for the Royal Theatre, Copenhagen, after a planned production of Mehul's opera was cancelled.

Recording
 Ungdom og Galskap Ulrik Cold, Djina Mai-Mai, Peter Grönlund, Guido Paevatalu, Poul Elming, Copenhagen Collegium Musicum, Michael Schønwandt 1997 Dacapo

References

Swedish-language operas
1806 operas
Operas